The Pillbugs were an American power pop and psychedelic pop group that emerged on the indie music scene in the late 1990s.

Based in Toledo, Ohio, the band consisted of Mark Mikel (vocals/guitar/keyboards), David Murnen (vocals/percussion), Mark Kelley (vocals/bass), Scott Tabner (guitar), Dan Chalmers (drums/vocals). They released 5 albums and initially billed themselves as "the world's most psychedelic band." Of this statement Mikel said, "I don't know if we are or not. We thought so when we first formed. It was just something to draw attention. It probably isn't completely true."

The Pillbugs disbanded in 2008 following Mark Kelley's death from an endocrine disorder.

History
1991 - 1998: Mark Mikel formed a band with David Murnen, Mark Kelley, Dan Chalmers and Scott Tabner named after himself. They performed numerous times and released two original albums named Sorghum Pudding in 1991, The Idiot Smiles in 1994, and one cover album named Blatant Ripoffs in 1996. After building fame in their area, they decided to change their name to make them more Beatles-esque, which because The Beatles were one of their greatest influences, makes "The Pillbugs" a fitting name. After they changed their name in early 1998, they began work on their first album under the name.

June 1998: The first Pillbugs CD is released on their own label (Omniphonic). This was a 32 song double-disc set. All songs were produced by Mark Mikel.

July 1999: Bass player/vocalist Mark Kelley is diagnosed with a rare lung cancer.

March 2003: The Pillbugs release their second album, The 3-Dimensional In-Popcycle Dream. This CD contained a 3D Fisher-Price/Viewmaster reel of band pics and album art. All songs were produced by Mark Mikel.

August 2003: Proverus releases a new version of the debut CD. All songs are the same but the artwork is changed/refined.

August 2004: The Pillbugs' third album, Happy Birthday, was released on the Proverus label. All songs were produced by Mark Mikel and Scott Hunt.

August 2004: The Pillbugs play their most high-profile gig at Arlene's Grocery in New York City.

October 2004: Bass player/vocalist Mark Kelley's cancer confines him to a wheelchair and permanent breathing machine. Despite being in this condition, he manages to supply the bass guitar for the next Pillbug album.
 
April 2007: The Pillbugs catch the attention of power pop label Rainbow Quartz who signed the band a deal for a "best-of" CD release. Later, this album was named Monclovia, after a township nearby Toledo.

June 2007: The Pillbugs release their fourth album (and second double CD) Buzz for Aldrin on the Proverus label. The songs' melodies, lyrics and themes are intertwined, ultimately leading back to their first album. The artwork was created by renowned California artist Mark Roland specifically for this release. All songs were produced by Mark Mikel. A video for the song "Spaced-Out" was also made.

July 2007: Proverus officially announces the third CD Happy Birthday is out of print.

August 2007: USA Today music editor Ken Barnes chooses The Pillbugs "All in Good Time" in his "Pick of the Week" column.

September 2007: USA Today music editor Ken Barnes chooses The Pillbugs "4 sec Nightmare in a 5 sec Dream" in his "Pick of the Week" column.

October 2007: The Rainbow Quartz CD Monclovia released in USA and Canada. Two previously unreleased Pillbugs songs open the disc: "Here's to the End of Time" (a new recording) and "Faceless Wonder" (a Buzz for Aldrin outtake). Two previously released songs were treated to remixes: "All in Good Time" and "Charlie Blue Car". All songs were produced by Mark Mikel and Scott Hunt.

November 2007: The Rainbow Quartz CD The Pillbugs-Monclovia released in Europe and Asia.

December 2007: NYC publication The Big Takeover places The Pillbugs in their Top 40 (issue 61).

February 8, 2008:  Pillbugs begin recording a new album for the Rainbow Quartz label.

May 3, 2008: Bass player/singer/songwriter Mark Kelley dies after a nine-year struggle.

May 2008: After the death of Mark Kelley, The Pillbugs go on an "indefinite hiatus". Later in May, they officially announced that The Pillbugs have broken up.

 November 10, 2008: Everybody Wants A Way Out was released by the label Rainbow Quartz, after the band officially broke up earlier in May. All songs were produced by Mark Mikel.

Discography
 1998: The Pillbugs
 2003: The 3-Dimensional In-Popcycle Dream
 2004: Happy Birthday
 2007: Buzz For Aldrin
 2008: Monclovia
 2008: Everybody Wants a Way Out
 2021:   Marigold Something

See also
List of indie pop artists

References

External links

American power pop groups
American psychedelic rock music groups
1990s establishments in Ohio
Musical quintets
Musical groups from Ohio